The Torneio dos Campeões - the "Tournament of Champions" - was an interclub tournament for association football clubs from Brazil, organised in 1967 by the football association of the state of Minas Gerais, the Federação Mineira de Futebol. Participants were the 1966 state champions of

 Rio de Janeiro: Bangu AC (RJ)
 São Paulo: SE Palmeiras (SP)
 Minas Gerais: Cruzeiro EC (Belo Horizonte)
and 
 Atlético Mineiro (BH), as the second strongest side from Belo Horizonte to attract a greater audience.

The matches 
Venue of all matches was the Estádio Governador Magalhães Pinto, commonly known as Mineirão, in Belo Horizonte, the capital of Minas Gerais. The first four matches were held in two double features.

18 January 1967:
 Attendance: 32,552 Revenue:  98,000 cruzeiros
 Atlético 3-1 SE Palmeiras
 Cruzeiro EC 0-2 Bangu AC

22 January 1967:
 Attendance: 55,478 Revenue:  160,000 cruzeiros
 Bangu AC 2-2 Atlético Mineiro
 Cruzeiro EC 3-2 SE Palmeiras

19 March 1967 - the final:

The deciding match served also as a match for the Torneio Roberto Gomes Pedrosa, a national tournament recognised ca. 2010 as official national championship.

 Attendance: 16,773 Revenue:  34,000 cruzeiros
 Atlético Mineiro 0-1 Bangu AC
 Atletico: Luizinho; Canindé (Warlei), Vânder, Grapete, Décio Teixeira; Vanderlei Paiva, Santana; Buião, Ronaldo, Beto (Edgar Maia), Tião - Coach: Gérson dos Santos.
 Bangu: Ubirajara; Cabrita, Mário Tito, Luis Alberto, Pedrinho; Ocimar, Jair; Paulo Borges, Cabralzinho (Fernando), Tonho,  Aladim - Coach: Martim Francisco.
 Referee: José Teixeira de Carvalho or José Gomes Sobrinho (RJ)
 Goal: Cabralzinho (8'); Expulsion: Vanderlei Paiva

References 
 1967, Galopédia (Atlético Mineiro). 
 1967, Bangu.net.
 Sérgio Leite: 22/01/1967: Cruzeiro 3x2 Palmeiras, Baú do Cruzeiro, 29/12/2013.
 Sérgio Leite: 18/01/1967: Cruzeiro 0x2 Bangu, Baú do Cruzeiro, 29/12/2013.

See also 

 Torneio dos Campeões da CBD (1969)
 Torneio dos Campeões (1982)

Defunct football competitions in Brazil
Football competitions in Minas Gerais